The following article concerns the performance of Brazil at the 2018 FIFA World Cup.

They reached the quarter-finals, eventually being knocked out 2–1 by Belgium.

Squad
Coach: Tite

Brazil's final squad was announced on 14 May 2018.

Group stage

Group E

Brazil vs Switzerland
The two teams had met in eight matches, including one game at the 1950 FIFA World Cup group stage, a 2–2 draw.

Paulinho's close-range effort forced Yann Sommer into a save. The first goal was scored shortly after when Philippe Coutinho scored from outside the penalty area with a right foot shot. Brazil also came close before the break as Thiago Silva headed inches over the crossbar. Five minutes into the second half, Steven Zuber equalised with a controversial header after a corner from the right decided by VAR review when he appeared to push Miranda in the back. More controversy was caused in the 73rd minute, after Gabriel Jesus was denied a penalty after being hacked down by Manuel Akanji in the penalty area. Brazil came close several times during the closing minutes, but Neymar, Roberto Firmino, and Miranda were unable to garner goals.

Brazil have failed to win any of their last three World Cup matches (D1 L2), their worst winless run since June 1978, when they went four games without a win. Valon Behrami is the first Switzerland player in history to appear at four World Cups. Brazil failed to win their opening match at the World Cup for the first time since 1978, when they drew 1–1 with Sweden.

Brazil vs Costa Rica
The two teams had met in ten matches, including two games at the FIFA World Cup's group stages, in 1990 and 2002, with both ending in a victory for Brazil's (1–0 and 5–2, respectively).

Celso Borges shot an effort wide of the target from a Cristian Gamboa cutback after 13 minutes. Gabriel Jesus shot into the back of the net from an offside position in the 25th minute. Marcelo shot a low drive five minutes from the break, which Keylor Navas stopped. After the break, Jesus headed against the crossbar before Navas diverted Philippe Coutinho's follow-up wide. Neymar curled around the right-hand post from 18 yards in the 72nd minute, before the officials arrived at the correct decision via VAR to deny him a penalty. Coutinho gave Brazil the lead in the 91st minute, when he burst into the box to get on the end of a Roberto Firmino nod down and a touch from Jesus before poking the ball low to the net. Neymar then tapped home Douglas Costa's chipped cross from the right from close range deeper into the stoppage time.

Neymar's strike seven minutes into stoppage time was the latest ever at a World Cup in regular time. This was Brazil's first World Cup victory thanks to a goal scored in the 90th minute. Costa Rica were knocked out of the tournament after this game for the first time since 2006, with a game to play.

Serbia vs Brazil
The two teams had met once, a 2014 friendly won by Brazil 1–0. Playing as Yugoslavia, the two teams met 18 times, including four times at FIFA World Cup's group stages in 1930, 1950, 1954 and 1974, with one victory each and two draws.

Marcelo was replaced with Filipe Luís in the 10th minute, due to a back spasm. Gabriel Jesus created a chance for Neymar, whose cross-goal strike was pushed away by Vladimir Stojković. Jesus cut inside of Miloš Veljković and saw his shot blocked behind by Nikola Milenković. In the 36th minute, Paulinho raced between two defenders and poked Philippe Coutinho's delivery beyond the onrushing Stojković. Neymar had a low drive kept out by Stojković at the near post five minutes into the second period. Aleksandar Mitrović headed a cross from Antonio Rukavina straight at the feet of the keeper in the 65th minute. Thiago Silva headed home at the near post from Neymar's left-wing corner in the 68th minute.

Brazil have qualified from the group stage of the World Cup for the 13th consecutive tournament, a run stretching back to 1970. Brazil have now won back-to-back World Cup matches for the first time since 2010, when they won their opening two group matches. For Serbia, this was the second consecutive elimination from the group stage in their World Cup history as an independent nation.

Knock-out stage

Brazil vs Mexico
The teams had met in 40 previous matches including two games at CONCACAF Gold Cup finals (1996 and 2003, both won by Mexico), the 1999 FIFA Confederations Cup Final (won 4–3 by Mexico), and four times in the FIFA World Cup group stage, three won by Brazil and one ending in a draw (4–0 in 1950, 5–0 in 1954, 2–0 in 1962 and 0–0 in 2014).

Hirving Lozano's half-volley was well blocked by Miranda, while at the other end, Guillermo Ochoa saved Neymar's drive from just outside the penalty area. After 25 minutes, Neymar raced past Edson Álvarez in the area and forced Ochoa into a save with his left hand. Gabriel Jesus went close in the 33rd minute, finding space in a crowded area and drilling in a left-footed strike that Ochoa palmed away. In the 51st minute, Neymar's back-heel on the edge of the area teed up Willian for a burst into the box and his scuffed cross from the left was slid into an empty net by Neymar from close range. With two minutes remaining, Neymar powered through on the left and his low effort was diverted by Ochoa's foot into the path of Roberto Firmino, who tapped the ball into an empty net from close range.

Since the introduction of the round of 16 in 1986, Mexico have been eliminated at this stage of the World Cup seven times – more than twice as many as any other nation. This was also Mexico's fourth defeat on the hand of Brazil, and moreover, Mexico had never scored a single goal against Brazil in the FIFA World Cup.

Brazil vs Belgium

The teams had met in four previous matches. Their most recent meeting came in a World Cup knockout stage match in 2002, Brazil winning 2–0 to advance to the quarter-finals. That match was also the only time the two sides had previously met in a World Cup.

Belgium scored from their first corner of the game in the 13th minute, Vincent Kompany flicked on Eden Hazard's left-wing delivery but the decisive touch came from Fernandinho, who turned the ball past Alisson via his arm. Belgium doubled their lead by breaking from a Brazil corner in the 31st minute, Kevin De Bruyne arrowed a right foot drive across Alisson and into the left corner of the net from the edge of the penalty area after Romelu Lukaku collected the ball, turned and embarked on a 40-yard run with a pass at the end to free De Bruyne. Brazil's third change yielded a goal three minutes and 14 seconds after his introduction, Renato Augusto gliding between two Belgium defenders to nod a flicked header past Thibaut Courtois from a Philippe Coutinho cross. Coutinho's first-time shot flew wide and yet another Neymar penalty appeal was rejected, before he drew a fingertip save from Courtois in the 94th minute.

De Bruyne became the 100th player to score at Russia 2018 (excluding own goals). Belgium have reached the World Cup semi-finals for only the second time, losing out to eventual winners Argentina in 1986. Belgium's victory was only their second ever against Brazil, and first since a 1963 friendly match in Brussels. This was the first time in 30 matches in all competitions that Brazil had conceded more than once in a game, since a 2–2 draw with Paraguay in March 2016.

References

 
Countries at the 2018 FIFA World Cup